Giannella is a village in Tuscany, central Italy,  administratively a frazione of the comune of Orbetello, province of Grosseto, in the Tuscan Maremma. At the time of the 2001 census its population amounted to 160.

Geography 
The hamlet of Giannella is located along the strip of land (tombolo) which connects the mainland with the promontory of Monte Argentario. It is a renowned tourist resort and a protected area with a WWF natural reserve.

See also 
 Albinia
 Ansedonia
 Fonteblanda
 San Donato, Orbetello
 Talamone

References

External links 
 Tourism in Orbetello

Frazioni of Orbetello
Cities and towns in Tuscany
Coastal towns in Tuscany